Richeza of Poland may refer to:

 Richeza of Poland, Queen of Castile
 Richeza of Poland, Queen of Hungary
 Richeza of Poland, Queen of Sweden